Grullos is one of eleven parishes (administrative divisions)  in Candamo, a municipality within the province and autonomous community of Asturias, in northern Spain. 

References  
	

Parishes in Candamo